Carrie Alexandra Coon (born January 24, 1981) is an American actress. In television, she is known for her starring roles as grieving mother Nora Durst in the HBO drama series The Leftovers (2014–2017) and as Gloria Burgle in the third season of the FX anthology series Fargo (2017). She won the TCA Award for Individual Achievement in Drama for both performances, won the Critics' Choice Television Award for Best Supporting Actress in a Drama Series for The Leftovers and was nominated for the Outstanding Lead Actress in a Limited Series or Movie for Fargo. She also had a leading role in the second season of the anthology drama series The Sinner (2018), and is known for playing Bertha Russell in the HBO series The Gilded Age.

On stage, Coon was nominated for a Tony Award for her performance in the 2012 revival of Who's Afraid of Virginia Woolf? She has also appeared in numerous films, including the psychological thriller Gone Girl (2014), the political drama The Post (2017), the heist thriller Widows (2018), the superhero film Avengers: Infinity War (2018), the period drama The Nest (2020), and the supernatural comedy Ghostbusters: Afterlife (2021).

Early life
Coon was born in Copley, Ohio on January 24, 1981, to Paula (née Ploenes) and John Coon. She has an older sister, an older brother, and two younger brothers. She graduated from Copley High School in 1999, next attending the University of Mount Union, graduating in 2003 with a BA in English and Spanish. In 2006, she earned her M.F.A. in acting from the University of Wisconsin–Madison.

Career

Early career
Coon began her career in regional theater. After graduating from the University of Wisconsin-Madison, Coon was immediately recruited by the Madison Repertory Theatre and made her professional stage debut in a production of Our Town. After her debut with the Madison Repertory Theatre, Coon joined the American Players Theatre and stayed with them for four seasons. Coon moved to Chicago in 2008 and made her Chicago debut with a production of Brontë at Remy Bumppo Theatre Company. Coon commuted between Chicago and Wisconsin for several years, alternating between Chicago productions, productions in Milwaukee, and seasons with the American Players Theatre. During these years, Coon provided for herself by performing motion capture work for a video game company based in Wisconsin.

Coon's breakthrough came in 2010 when she was cast as Honey in the Steppenwolf Theatre Company production of Who's Afraid of Virginia Woolf? The role immediately resulted in further parts in Chicago productions, and she followed the production to performances in Washington, D.C. and New York City, making her Broadway debut. For her performance, she won a Theatre World Award and received a Tony Award nomination.

Coon made her screen debut in an episode of the short-lived NBC series The Playboy Club in 2011. She later guest-starred on Law & Order: Special Victims Unit, Ironside, and Intelligence.

Breakthrough with Gone Girl and The Leftovers
Following her Tony Award nomination, in 2014 Coon was cast as one of the main characters in the HBO drama series The Leftovers, alongside Justin Theroux, Amy Brenneman, and Ann Dowd. That same year, she made her film debut in Gone Girl, based on the 2012 novel of same name and directed by David Fincher.

In early 2015, Coon starred in the lead role of the Off-Broadway production of Placebo at Playwrights Horizons. She also participated in readings for her husband Tracy Letts' 2015–2016 season play Mary Page Marlowe and was in talks to perform in the production in Chicago if her filming schedule with The Leftovers permits; in December 2015, it was announced that Coon would be one of six actresses portraying the title character in Mary Page Marlowe for the Steppenwolf Theatre Company in Chicago from March to May 2016. In April 2015, Coon left The Gersh Agency for United Talent Agency. In October and November 2015, Coon filmed the movie Strange Weather alongside actress Holly Hunter for director Katherine Dieckmann in Mississippi. In December 2015, she filmed the horror romance The Keeping Hours for director Karen Moncrieff and Blumhouse Productions.

Coon starred in the lead role of Gloria Burgle in the third season of the FX anthology series Fargo. She received a nomination for the Outstanding Lead Actress in a Limited Series or Movie for her role and won the TCA Award for Individual Achievement in Drama for both Fargo and The Leftovers. In 2017, she played real life journalist Meg Greenfield in the Steven Spielberg-directed historical drama film The Post. In 2018, Coon co-starred in the Steve McQueen heist thriller film Widows.

Coon provided the voice and motion capture for Proxima Midnight, a member of the Black Order and a child of Thanos, in the Russo brothers-directed superhero film Avengers: Infinity War (2018).

On April 30, 2020, Coon joined the cast of the HBO drama series The Gilded Age as Bertha Russell, replacing Amanda Peet.

She received a Canadian Screen Award nomination for Best Actress at the 9th Canadian Screen Awards in 2021, for her work in the film The Nest.

Personal life
Coon married actor and playwright Tracy Letts in 2013. They have a son who was born in 2018 and a daughter born in 2021.

Filmography

Film

Television

Stage

Awards and nominations

References

External links
 
 
 
 

1981 births
Living people
American film actresses
American stage actresses
American television actresses
University of Mount Union alumni
University of Wisconsin–Madison alumni
Theatre World Award winners
21st-century American actresses
People from Copley, Ohio
Actresses from Ohio
Obie Award recipients
Motion capture actresses